Knollwood may refer to the following places in the U.S.:

Knollwood, Los Angeles, California
Knollwood, Illinois
Knollwood (Worcester, Massachusetts), listed on the NRHP
Knollwood (Dublin, New Hampshire), listed on the NRHP 
Knollwood Estate, Muttontown, New York
Knollwood (Star Lake, New York), listed on the NRHP in St. Lawrence County
Knollwood (Bearden Hill), Knoxville, Tennessee, listed on the NRHP
Knollwood, Texas
Knollwood Village, Houston, Texas

See also
Knollwood Club, an Adirondack Great Camp on Lower Saranac Lake in New York